For Your Eyes Only was a gaming magazine first published in 1980 by Simulations Publications, Inc., edited by David James Ritchie.

Contents
For Your Eyes Only was an expansion of the old FYEO column from Strategy & Tactics magazine, and covers military news: recent actions, possible upcoming developments, technology, and more.

Reception
Steve Jackson reviewed For Your Eyes Only in The Space Gamer No. 44. Jackson commented that "Very few of us need this kind of data [...] For those who do, though, FYEO is probably worth the cost. Recommended for the professional game designer or well-off modern/future game buff."

References

Game magazines